Jean Jospin Engola (born 29 October 1997) is a Cameroonian footballer who last played for LA Galaxy II in the USL.

Career
After spending time in the Kadji Sports Academy Engola signed on loan with LA Galaxy II, a USL affiliate club of LA Galaxy.

References

External links
Galaxy bio

1997 births
Living people
Cameroonian footballers
Cameroonian expatriate footballers
LA Galaxy II players
Association football midfielders
USL Championship players
Cameroonian expatriate sportspeople in the United States
Kadji Sports Academy players